Frankenstein Meets the Wolf Man is a 1943 American horror film directed by Roy William Neill and starring Lon Chaney Jr. as the Wolf Man and Bela Lugosi as Frankenstein's monster. This was the first of a series of later called "monster rallies" combining characters from several film series. This film's script written by Curt Siodmak follows The Ghost of Frankenstein and The Wolf Man. The film involves Larry Talbot who is brought back to life. Seeking a way to return to his death to escape his werewolf curse, he meets with gypsy Maleva (Maria Ouspenskaya) who advises him that the only way to stay dead is to confer with Dr. Frankenstein. The doctor is long dead but his equipment is in working condition, leading Talbot to seek the help of scientist Dr. Mannering (Patric Knowles) and Frankenstein descendant Baroness Elsa Frankenstein (Ilona Massey). Talbot then attempts to have his life sucked from his body and transferred into Frankenstein's monster (Bela Lugosi).

Developed under the title Wolf Man Meets Frankenstein, the film was originally developed with Lon Chaney Jr. to portray both Frankenstein's Monster and the Wolf Man, an idea that was halted before production began because of the physical toll it would take on the actor. The script was filmed with the monster originally having lines of dialogue which were later removed after a studio pre-screening for the film which led to the production staff laughing at Bela Lugosi's delivery of the lines. This led to Lugosi's dialogue being removed from the final film. The film was released to what the authors of the book Universal Horrors described as "lukewarm reviews". The film led to a series of what were later described as "monster rallies" involving having name-brand monsters interact with each other in films. Universal would follow this with The House of Frankenstein and House of Dracula.

Plot

Four years after the events of The Wolf Man and The Ghost of Frankenstein, two graverobbers break into the Talbot family crypt on the night of a full moon and open the grave of Larry Talbot, believing that he was interred with valuables on his person. During the robbery, they remove the wolfsbane buried with Talbot and accidentally revive him by exposing his body to the full moon's light. He grasps the arm of the grave robber with a fur-covered hand, as the other thief flees. Talbot is found by the police in Cardiff later that night and taken to a hospital. Treated by Dr. Mannering, Talbot slowly comes to understand his situation. During the full moon, he becomes the Wolf Man and kills a police constable. The next morning, Mannering realizes his patient was outside and tries to reason with him. Unable to accept Talbot's explanation of his curse, Dr. Mannering allows Inspector Owen to question his patient. Talbot becomes violently irate, then is overcome by orderlies and bound to his bed with leather straps. Not believing his story of being a werewolf, the doctor and detective travel to the village of Llanwelly to investigate Talbot and his story. Meanwhile, Talbot escapes from the hospital to seek a cure for his curse. He leaves Wales and talks to Maleva, a gypsy woman with hearsay knowledge of Dr. Frankenstein. She opines he may be able to help Talbot. Together they travel across Europe to Vasaria, a village where Talbot hopes to find Dr. Frankenstein's notes in the remains of his estate and permanently end his own life through scientific means. The townsfolk refuse to help them in any way.

An upset Talbot transforms into the Wolf Man and kills a young woman, causing a mob of villagers to chase him down. Fleeing toward the ruins of Frankenstein's castle, Talbot falls through the burned-out flooring and into the frozen cellars below. He recovers from his animal state, and wanders around, discovering Frankenstein's Monster trapped within an icy chamber. Using a stone, Talbot breaks the ice and helps pull the now-revived creature free. As the Monster is unable to locate the notes, Talbot poses as a potential buyer of the Frankenstein estate in order to find Baroness Elsa Frankenstein, the daughter of Ludwig, hoping she knows their hiding place. She declines to assist Talbot, but the pair are invited to the "Festival of the New Wine" by the Burgomeister. During the festival, Dr. Mannering arrives. Having followed Talbot across Europe, Mannering attempts to persuade him to return to Wales before having another spell. Talbot refuses to go with Mannering, while the Monster crashes the festival. With the Monster revealed, Elsa and Mannering agree to help the villagers rid themselves of Frankenstein's curse forever. The following morning, the couple, with Maleva in tow, meet with Talbot and the Monster at the ruins. The Baroness gives the notes to Talbot and the doctor, who quickly learn how to drain all life from both Talbot and the Monster and believe the laboratory can be repaired for the task.

In the meantime, the villagers are dismayed to see crates of scientific instruments arriving for Dr. Mannering. Fearing another attack from the Frankenstein Monster and the Wolf Man, the villagers grow suspicious. Vazec, the innkeeper, details a plan to destroy the dam overlooking the Frankenstein estate and drown all within. The Burgomeister dismisses the idea as nothing but a drunken notion, but Vazec is determined and puts his plan into action.

Meanwhile, Dr. Mannering begins his experimental procedure of draining the life force from both Talbot and the Monster. However, Mannering's scientific curiosity to see the monster at full strength overwhelms his logic, and to Elsa's horror, he decides to alter the machines to fully revive him. The experiment coincides on the night of a full moon, and Talbot transforms yet again as the Monster regains his strength. The Monster begins to carry Elsa away, but the Wolf Man attacks him. She escapes from the castle with Mannering as the Wolf Man and the Monster engage in a fight. The battle ends when they are both swept away in the flood caused by Vazec dynamiting the dam.

Cast
Cast adapted from the book Universal Horrors:

Production
Curt Siodmak discussed the development of Frankenstein Meets the Wolf Man at the beginning with producer George Waggner proposing the title to him.  Siodmak explained that he wanted to purchase a new car and needed a writing job to afford it, which led to Waggner telling him to buy the car as he had two hours to agree to write the script. Richard G. Hubler of the Saturday Evening Post stated that the film was prompted by the nearly one million dollar gross of The Wolf Man. The screenplay of Frankenstein Meets the Wolf Man merges the stories of the two films, as The Wolf Man was set in the present day with the sequel taking place four years later, while the Frankenstein story is set in a much earlier era. The authors of Universal Horrors commented on this, stating that "probably almost no one noticed or cared about details like this when the film was released", as Universal had begun targeting their films to a younger audience. Several minor changes were made to Siodmak's script before the film was completed, such as grave robbers finding Talbot's body with long fingernails, a hospital scene with Dr. Harley (later changed to Dr. Mannering in the film) and Inspector Owen finding Talbot's clothes rotten and moldy and his shirt falling apart.

Universal's plan for the film, initially titled Wolf Man Meets Frankenstein, was to have Lon Chaney Jr. portray both Frankenstein's Monster and The Wolf Man. This plan was dropped due to concerns that the intricate effects would not be effective, and the physical strain it would place on Chaney to play both parts. Chaney initially insisted on playing only The Frankenstein Monster and Universal briefly considered recasting the role of Talbot by borrowing Warner Brothers contract star Jack Carson before Chaney reconsidered and agreed to reprise the role of Lawrence Talbot. Among the cast was Dwight Frye, who died several months after the film's release, making it his final film for Universal.

Frankenstein Meets the Wolf Man went into production in October 1942 with Waggner producing and Roy William Neill directing. The climactic battle between the Wolf Man and the Monster was handled by two stuntmen, Gil Perkins for Lugosi and Eddie Parker. The battle was organized with instructions from Roy William Neill telling them where to start their fight, where to finish, and what kind of fight he wanted it to be, and letting the two actors figure out the rest. On October 5, 1942, Maria Ouspenskaya suffered an ankle injury, and Lugosi collapsed on set and was ordered home by a physician. The cause of Lugosi's collapse was exhaustion from the 35 pounds of make-up he wore.

In keeping with the timeline of The Ghost of Frankenstein, in the script of Frankenstein Meets the Wolf Man the brain of the character Ygor was transplanted into the monster, who was able to speak and was planning to take revenge on the world. Three scenes were shot with the monster having dialogue. Following a preview screening in the studio, the film played normally until Bela Lugosi as the monster spoke, upon which the staff on hand convulsed with laughter. Siodmak explained that "Lugosi couldn't talk! They had left the dialogue I wrote for the Monster in the picture when they shot it, but with Lugosi it sounded so Hungarian funny that they had to take it out!" Without the dialogue, the fact that the revived monster was blind is not mentioned in the finished film. Edward Bernds, the sound man on other Neill films stated that the director had "absolutely no sense of humor" and would not have recognized the comedic nature of the scenes.

Release

Frankenstein Meets the Wolf Man premiered in New York on March 5, 1943. It was later distributed theatrically by the Universal Pictures Company on March 12, 1943. Clips of Frankenstein Meets the Wolf Man show up in other 1943 films, including He's My Guy where Dick Foran and Irene Harvey work in a vaudeville-movie house where the film is playing. In one scene, Joan Davis enters the auditorium and sees the Wolf Man growl, prompting her to growl back, sending the Wolf Man running away whining. In the film Top Man, Peggy Ryan jumps into the back seat of a convertible and for no reason exclaims "Frankenstein Meets the Wolf Man!" Author and critic Kim Newman proclaimed the film to be "one of the most-often excerpted films in movie history", noting that it would later appear in the background of Mad Dog and Glory, being ignored by Robert De Niro and Uma Thurman as they have sex, and appearing in the background of Alien vs. Predator.

Reception
The authors of Universal Horrors described the initial reception to the film as "generally lukewarm", with many writers treating the film as a joke. Bosley Crowther of The New York Times stated that "there's only a little tussle between [the monster and the Wolf Man] at the end. And that only lasts but a moment. They are both washed away during same. Too bad. Not very horrible. Universal will have to try again". Kate Cameron of The New York Daily News gave the film two and a half stars, noting that the "producers have spent time and money on the production and have gone to considerable trouble to give it the proper atmospheric touches". Harrison's Reports wrote: "For those devotees who like their horror pictures strong, this one will fill the bill ... The action and the eerie atmosphere conforms to a familiar pattern, but it does not detract from the film's horrendous nature". "Walt." of Variety declared that Siodmak "delivers a good job of fantastic writing to weave the necessary thriller ingredients into the piece" and "director Roy William Neill deftly paces the film with both movement and suspense to keep audience interest on sustained plane".  Film Daily called it "a horror feast in which devotees of the weird and the fantastic will gorge themselves to bursting. The opportunities for screams are offered with unparalleled generosity".

From retrospective reviews, the authors of Universal Horrors stated that a great part in the success and popularity of the film was Chaney's portrayal of The Wolf Man which was described as "as good or better than the one he gave in The Wolf Man". The authors criticized the screenplay by Siodmak as a weak element, noting how it either ignores or forgets events of the previous films. Kim Newman gave the film three stars, and wrote in Empire that the film was "silly but enormous fun", noting the gypsy song in the film and the climactic final battle as standouts.

Legacy
Frankenstein Meets the Wolf Man was the first of what would become known as the "monster rally films". These would be followed with other name-brand film monsters in crossovers such as House of Frankenstein and House of Dracula. The authors of Universal Horrors declared that these films are "often blamed for the decline and demise of the classic Dracula and Frankenstein series, but by the mid-40s they were on their last legs anyways", and the monster rallies "may be juvenilia, but they're slick and enjoyable, and a welcome opportunity for many of the best-loved horror stars to congregate in a single picture", and that among these monster rallies, Frankenstein Meets the Wolf Man was the best in the series. Kim Newman declared that the film set the precedent for future similarly themed films such as King Kong vs. Godzilla and Freddy vs. Jason.

See also
 List of films featuring Frankenstein's monster
 Frankenstein in popular culture
 Werewolves in popular culture

References

Footnotes

Sources

External links

Frankenstein Meets the Wolf Man at Rotten Tomatoes

1943 films
1940s supernatural horror films
American black-and-white films
American sequel films
American supernatural horror films
Films directed by Roy William Neill
Films set in castles
Films set in Europe
Films with screenplays by Curt Siodmak
Frankenstein (Universal film series)
Horror crossover films
Universal Pictures films
American werewolf films
Films about Romani people
1940s English-language films
1940s American films